Édouard Séguin (January 20, 1812 – October 28, 1880) was a French physician and educationist born in Clamecy, Nièvre. He is remembered for his work with children having cognitive impairments in France and the United States.

Background and career in France 
He studied at the Collège d’Auxerre and the Lycée Saint-Louis in Paris, and from 1837 studied and worked under Jean Marc Gaspard Itard, who was an educator of deaf-mute individuals, that included the celebrated case of Victor of Aveyron, also known as "The Wild Child". It was Itard who persuaded Séguin to dedicate himself to study the causes, as well as the training of individuals with intellectual disabilities. As a young man, Séguin was also influenced by the ideas of utopian socialist Henri de Saint-Simon.

Around 1840, he established the first private school in Paris dedicated to the education of individuals with intellectual disabilities. In 1846, he published Traitement Moral, Hygiène, et Education des Idiots (The Moral Treatment, Hygiene, and Education of Idiots and Other Backward Children). This work is considered to be the earliest systematic textbook dealing with the special needs of children with intellectual disabilities.

Achievements in the United States 
Following the European revolutions of 1848, Séguin emigrated to the United States. After visiting various schools, modeled on his own, that had been established in the United States, and assisting in their organization, he settled in Cleveland, and later in Portsmouth, Ohio. Later he relocated to New York State and set up a medical practice in Mount Vernon (1860). In 1861 he received an M.D. from the University of the City of New York. In 1863 he moved to New York City, where he made efforts to improve conditions of children with disabilities at Randall's Island asylum.

In the United States, he established a number of schools in various cities for treatment of the mentally disabled. 
In 1866 he published "Idiocy: and its Treatment by the Physiological Method"; a book in which he described the methods used at the "Séguin Physiological School" in New York City. Programs used in Séguin's schools stressed the importance of developing self-reliance and independence in the intellectually disabled by giving them a combination of physical and intellectual tasks.

Édouard Séguin became the first president of the "Association of Medical Officers of American Institutions for Idiotic and Feebleminded Persons", an organization that would later be known as the American Association on Mental Retardation. His work with individuals with intellectual disabilities was a major inspiration to Italian educator Maria Montessori.

In the 1870s, Séguin published three works in the field of thermometry, a field he had been devoting himself to since 1866: Thermomètres physiologiques (Paris, 1873); Tableaux de thermométrie mathématique (1873); and "Medical Thermometry and Human Temperature" (New York, 1876). He also devised a special "physiological thermometer" in which zero was the standard temperature of health. In addition, a medical symptom known as "Séguin's signal" is named after him, being described as an involuntary muscle contraction prior to an epileptic attack.

Works

Notes

References
 DHM: Library- In Memory Of Edouard Seguin, M.D. (Document)
 Parts of this article are based on a translation of the equivalent article from the German Wikipedia.

External links 

 Excerpts of Séguin's 1866 Treatise on Treatment of the Mentally Handicapped
Scientific American, "Dr. Edward Seguin", 27 November 1880, p. 344

1812 births
1880 deaths
French physiologists
People from Nièvre
French educational theorists
Lycée Saint-Louis alumni
French emigrants to the United States
American physiologists
American educational theorists